Sivok-Rangpo Railway Line is a line currently under construction to connect the Indian states of West Bengal and Sikkim. It branches out from New Jalpaiguri–Alipurduar–Samuktala Road line at Sivok railway station, Sevoke Town near Siliguri in Darjeeling district and runs through villages and towns of Kalimpong district of West Bengal and terminates in Rangpo Railway Station in Rangpo, Pakyong District of Sikkim. In the second phase of construction, this line will be extended till Gangtok, the capital of Sikkim, and later to the Nathu La pass, along the border with Tibet. This railway line lies under Northeast Frontier Railway zone Alipurduar railway division. The total length of this railway line is 44.96 Kilometres.

This railway line is being constructed by Ircon International company. This railway line covers Darjeeling district and Kalimpong district of West Bengal and Pakyong District of Sikkim.

Route
Sivok-Rangpo Railway Line passes through Mahananda Wildlife Sanctuary, River Teesta and River Rangpo.

It passes through villages and towns like Kalijhora, Birik daara, Lohapul, Rambi Bazar, Gailkhola, Teesta Bazaar, Chitrey, Melli, Kirnay, Tarkhola, Chanatar, Rangpo and Khanikhola, Majitar, Rangpo. The line traverses through Mahananda Wildlife Sanctuary, Darjeeling Forest Division, Kurseong Forest Division, Kalimpong Forest Division of West Bengal and Pakyong District Forest Division of Sikkim.

Stations
There will be following stations:
 Sivok railway station in Sevoke
 Riyang Railway Station in Rambi Bazar
  (Underground Railway Station) in Teesta Bazaar
 Melli Railway Station in Melli and
 Rangpo railway station in Mining, Rangpo.

Under-construction extension

Sivok–Rangpo line, 44 km-long line, will provide access to Gangtok in Sikkim. The foundation stone for construction of a new railway line from Sevoke railway station to proposed Rangpo railway station on the border of Sikkim and West Bengal was laid in October 2009 by the vice president of India. In 2008, the line was proposed to be 53 km long with  broad gauge track but the final alignment is 45 km long with 3.5 km in Sikkim state and the rest in West Bengal state. The track will have 28 bridges and 14 tunnels and 38.5 km of the track will be in tunnels. Bridges over deep gorges and valleys will provide a scenic journey. The track is due to be constructed through the foothills of the Kanchanjungha mountain range and the Teesta river valley. New railway stations will be constructed at Melli, Teesta Bazaar, Geil Khola, Riang, and Rangpo.

The Indian Railways signed a contract with the construction company, IRCON, only in May 2010 but the final alignment had not been fixed for the first 22 km through elephant sanctuary forest even in 2013 and the final clearance of environment ministry had not been received. To obtain approval of the environment and forest ministry, the railways made a proposal in February 2013 to install elephant sensors along the stretch of the proposed railway line in Mahananda elephant sanctuary or run the trains at a speed of only 20 km per hour in the forest area and stop when an elephant is sighted close to the track. People of two villages in East Sikkim, through which a 3.5 km stretch of the 45 km long railway line has been planned, had not agreed to give their land for laying the track. The project cost has escalated from the estimated cost of Rs.13.4 billion in 2008

The Supreme Court of India approved the project in February 2016 with strict guidelines of the National Wildlife Board that cleared the project in June 2015 but ordered restricted speed, wireless animal tracking sensors and allowed digging of tunnels only during daytime. The railway line is needed for security and socio-economic reasons. The railway line will help troops and armaments move faster towards the Indo-Tibet border. Railway Board chairman visited and met the Northeast Frontier Railway (NFR) officials on 2 March 2018 to discuss the commencement of construction of the track and tunnels. The railway line up to Rangpo is expected to be completed in 2021. In the second phase the line will be extended up to Gangtok.

 Estimated cost: Rs.1,340 crore in 2008.
 Length of final alignment: 44.98 km
 Stations en route: Riang, Gailkhola, Tista Bazaar, Melli
 Nearest junction: New Jalpaiguri (30 km from Sevoke through Siliguri)
 Route under tunnels: 38.53 km (86%)
 Number of bridges: 28
 Number of tunnels: 14
 Longest tunnel: 5.1 km

Status update

 September 2022: Sevoke-Rangpo rail link will be ready by 2023-end, 55% of 14 main tunnels (22km out of 39km tunnel route) and 40% of 13 major bridges are complete.

See also
 Geostrategic railways under-construction in India
 India-China Border roads and rails

References

Alipurduar railway division
Railway stations in Kalimpong district
Railway stations in Pakyong district
Railway stations in Sikkim
Proposed infrastructure in Sikkim
Proposed infrastructure in West Bengal
5 ft 6 in gauge railways in India
Transport in Sikkim